Orbod Mebej is the first studio album from the Serbian hip-hop group, Bad Copy.
It was released in 1996.

Track listing
 Intro (1:23)
 Bad Copy ride (5:11)
 Disciplina kicme (3:57)
 Gedza (4:17)
 Kurslus (3:40)
 Nista od repovanja (2:51)
 Profuknjaca (3:10)
 Zabaci domacine (4:04)
 Outro (1:27)

References
Last FM
Popboks

1996 albums
Bad Copy albums